The Omlet Ltd Eglu is a brand of chicken coop marketed in the UK.  The Eglu is intended for small-scale, backyard chicken keeping.  The original design was created by four graduates from the Royal College of Art.

Background
Omlet Ltd was founded in 2004 by James Tuthil, Johannes Paul, Simon Nicholls and William Windham.   The company's introductory product, the Eglu, has won a number of awards, including the BSI Design Award and the Horners Award.  It comes in several colours, and features a run of 220 centimetres (about 7 feet).  The Eglu itself is roughly 80 centimetres (2 feet, 8 inches) long and wide.  The company also sells exactly the same models for rabbits and guinea pigs.

Markets and marketing
Since its founding, Omlet has grown into one of the largest chicken house retailers in the United Kingdom.  The company is based in Wardington, Great Britain, and sells to customers worldwide including the U.S., Germany, France and Holland.

See also
Chickens as pets

Notes

References

 New Jackets for Hens Solo and Princess Layer; BBC News; accessed .
 Reflective Chicken Jacket Will Protect Your Pet Cluckers; KING5.com; Seattle; accessed .
 What Did the Chicken Wear When It Crossed the Road?; GA Daily News; accessed .

External links

 

Poultry farming in the United Kingdom
Online retailers of the United Kingdom